Baker is an unincorporated community on the Lost River in Hardy County, West Virginia, United States. Baker is located at the intersection of U.S. Route 48, West Virginia Route 55, West Virginia Route 29 and West Virginia Route 259.  The ZCTA population for Baker's ZIP Code was 1,262 at the 2000 census, though the zip code covers a much larger area than the actual community itself.

The community has the name of the local Baker family.

See also
 Short Mountain Wildlife Management Area

References

Unincorporated communities in Hardy County, West Virginia
Unincorporated communities in West Virginia